Harth is a surname. Notable people with the surname include:

Alfred 23 Harth, German artist
C. Ernst Harth (born 1970), Canadian actor
Sidney Harth (1925–2011), American classical violinist and conductor
Yoram Harth (born 1958), Israeli dermatologist

See also
Miguel Harth-Bedoya (born 1968), Peruvian conductor
Hearth
Iranian high-aspect-ratio twin-hull vessels (HARTH)